Chiasmia streniata is a moth of the family Geometridae first described by Achille Guenée in 1858. It is found in most countries of subtropical Africa, from Sénégal to Kenya and Sudan to South Africa.

The wingspan is 28 mm.

Subspecies
 Chiasmia streniata streniata (Guenée, 1858) - continental Africa
 Chiasmia streniata arata (Saalmüller, 1891) - from Madagascar

References
Guenée 1857. In: Boisduval, J. A. B. & Guenée, A. Histoire naturelle des insectes. Spécies général des Lépidoptères. X. Uranides et Phalénites. Tome II. - — 10:1–584.

Macariini
Moths described in 1858
Moths of Madagascar
Moths of Sub-Saharan Africa
Lepidoptera of West Africa
Lepidoptera of Mozambique
Lepidoptera of the Republic of the Congo
Lepidoptera of Ethiopia
Lepidoptera of Tanzania
Lepidoptera of Zimbabwe